The term "Trekking Peak"  is a commonly misunderstood colloquial term which may refer to a variety of types of peaks in the Himalayan Region. The term is most often associated with Group "B" NMA Climbing Peaks classified by the Nepal Mountaineering Association or easier. Some may use the term "Trekking Peak" to solely describe peaks requiring little to no technical climbing experience.  Others may use the term to describe all mountains regulated by the Nepal Mountaineering Association including Group "A" NMA Expedition Peaks which may require considerable difficulties and technical climbing skill.

Because of the term's loose classification of peaks it can be misleading, encompassing peaks of significant varying difficulties. There is less general consensus for the use of the term in this context of Group "A" NMA Expedition Peaks.

Nepal
Fifteen peaks classified as Group "B" NMA Climbing Peaks are generally considered "trekking" peaks. These peaks do not exceed  in elevation and can be reasonably climbed from a base camp with the possible use of a high camp. To be climbed, these peaks typically require an amount of mountaineering experience and skills and the use of specialized mountaineering equipment, such as crampons and ice axes.  The easiest routes to the summits of these mountains are all challenging enough to warrant a mountaineering difficulty grade by the International French Adjectival System. The Trekking Agencies Association of Nepal also calls several Group A peaks "trekking peaks" but these are considerably more difficult despite being lower than 7000 meters. The fees for Group A peaks are higher than Group B peaks as are others costs and the time required.

In Nepal there are numerous peaks that require no technical expertise to climb, which may also be considered trekking peaks. These peaks are not tracked by the Nepal Mountaineering Association. Many of these peaks see a substantial number of summits each year by hikers and trekkers in the region without the use of specialized equipment. The routes to the summits of these mountains may not be challenging enough to warrant a mountaineering difficulty grade by the International French Adjectival System.

India
The Indian Mountaineering Foundation defines trekking peaks as mountains that require technical mountaineering skills and equipment but are still climbable by "trekkers" who have some experience or obtain training. Climbers are not required to obtain permits from or pay royalties to the Indian Mountaineering Foundation. However, some peaks are located near the military line of control, meaning close to borders of neighboring countries and permission and permits may be required from local civil or army authorities for security reasons. Also, some peaks may be out of reach for foreign climbers.

The Indian Mountaineering Foundation has designated 3 trekking peaks in the Indian Himalayan Region.

References

 
 
Himalayas